The Best of A Tribe Called Quest is a 2008 compilation album consisting of songs recorded by A Tribe Called Quest and released between 1988 and 1998.

Track listing
"Can I Kick It?" – 4:12
"Bonita Applebum" – 3:36
"Vibes and Stuff" – 4:18
"1nce Again (featuring Tammy Lucas)" – 3:49
"Jazz (We've Got)" (Re-Recording) – 4:19
"Like It like That" – 2:47
"I Left My Wallet in El Segundo" – 4:07
"Hot Sex" – 2:47
"Check the Rhime" – 3:37
"Description of a Fool" – 5:42
"Sucka Nigga" – 4:05
"Buggin' Out" – 3:38
"Scenario" – 4:11
"Oh My God" – 3:28
"Award Tour (featuring Trugoy the Dove of De La Soul)" – 3:46

Hip hop compilation albums
A Tribe Called Quest albums
Albums produced by Q-Tip (musician)
Albums produced by J Dilla
2008 greatest hits albums